The Roman Catholic Diocese of Tlapa is a suffragan diocese of the Archdiocese of Acapulco.

Ordinaries
Alejo Zavala Castro (1992 - 2005), appointed Bishop of Chilpancingo-Chilapa, Guerrero
Oscar Roberto Domínguez Couttolenc, M.G. (2007 - 2012), appointed Bishop of Ecatepec, México
Dagoberto Sosa Arriaga (2012–present)

Episcopal see
Tlapa de Comonfort, Guerrero

External links and references

Tlapa
Tlapa, Roman Catholic Diocese of
Tlapa
Tlapa